Like other crops cocoa can be attacked by a number of pest species including fungal diseases, insects and rodents - some of which (e.g. frosty pod rot and cocoa pod borer) have increased dramatically in geographical range and are sometimes described as "invasive species".

Bacterial diseases

Fungal diseases

Miscellaneous diseases

Nematodes, parasitic

Parasitic plants

Viral and viroid diseases

References

 Common Names of Diseases, The American Phytopathological Society
 IPARC Guide to cocoa pests and their management.

 List
Cocoa production
Cacao